Tyrone Gray (born August 4, 1955) is a former Canadian football wide receiver in the Canadian Football League who played for the BC Lions, Ottawa Rough Riders, and Saskatchewan Roughriders. He played college football for the Washington State Cougars.

References

1955 births
Living people
American football wide receivers
Canadian football wide receivers
BC Lions players
Ottawa Rough Riders players
Saskatchewan Roughriders players
Washington State Cougars football players